José Angel Mujica (born June 29, 1996) is a Venezuelan professional baseball pitcher in the Washington Nationals organization. He previously played in Major League Baseball (MLB) for the Colorado Rockies.

Career

Tampa Bay Rays
Mujica signed with the Tampa Bay Rays as an international free agent in July 2012. He spent the 2013 season with the GCL Rays, going 3–2 with a 3.09 ERA over 32 innings. He appeared in only two game for the GCL Rays in 2014 due to a foot injury. He split the 2015 season between the Princeton Rays and the Bowling Green Hot Rods, going a combined 2–4 with a 3.18 ERA over 65 innings. He spent the 2016 season with Bowling Green, going 8–4 with a 3.46 ERA over 130 innings. He split the 2017 season between the Charlotte Stone Crabs, and the Montgomery Biscuits, going a combined 14–8 with a 3.04 ERA over  innings. The Rays added him to their 40-man roster after the 2017 season. Mujica split the 2018 season between the GCL, Charlotte, and the Durham Bulls, going a combined 6–2 with a 3.75 ERA over  innings. Mujica underwent Tommy John surgery in September 2018 and missed the 2019 season. Mujica was outrighted off the Rays roster on November 20, 2018. He became a free agent following the 2019 season.

Colorado Rockies
On November 27, 2019, Mujica signed a major league contract with the Colorado Rockies. On September 4, 2020, Mujica was promoted to the major leagues for the first time. He made his debut on September 8 against the San Diego Padres, and gave up 7 runs, 6 earned, including a Wil Myers grand slam. Mujica made 2 appearances for the Rockies in 2020, recording a 12.46 ERA and 1 strikeout. 
Mujica was assigned to the Triple-A Albuquerque Isotopes to begin the 2021 season. On September 3, Mujica cleared waivers and was outrighted off of the Rockies 40-man roster. On October 13, Mujica elected free agency.

New York Yankees
On March 30, 2022, Mujica signed a minor league contract with the New York Yankees. He elected free agency on November 10, 2022.

Washington Nationals
On January 3, 2023, Mujica signed a minor league deal with the Washington Nationals.

References

External links

1996 births
Living people
Major League Baseball players from Venezuela
Venezuelan expatriate baseball players in the United States
Major League Baseball pitchers
Colorado Rockies players
Gulf Coast Rays players
Princeton Rays players
Bowling Green Hot Rods players
Charlotte Stone Crabs players
Montgomery Biscuits players
Durham Bulls players
Sportspeople from Valencia, Venezuela